Andrew Watson (born 13 November 1978) is an English footballer who plays as a midfielder.

Career
Watson was born in Leeds, West Yorkshire. He signed for Doncaster Rovers towards the end of the 1998–99 season, a £25,000 buy from Garforth Town. He was in the side that won promotion from the Football Conference in 2003, he has never made a Football League appearance. A move to Chester City a year later was unsuccessful, as he was injured in pre-season and left the club after a solitary Football League Trophy outing.

References

External links

1978 births
Living people
Footballers from Leeds
English footballers
Association football midfielders
Garforth Town A.F.C. players
Doncaster Rovers F.C. players
Tamworth F.C. players
Farsley Celtic A.F.C. players
Chester City F.C. players
Forest Green Rovers F.C. players
National League (English football) players